Ransom is a city in Ness County, Kansas, United States.  As of the 2020 census, the population of the city was 260.

History
The namesake of Ransom is Thomas E. G. Ransom.

The first post office in Ransom was established in 1887, but it was called Ogdensburgh until 1888.

Ransom was incorporated as a city in 1905.

Geography
Ransom is located at  (38.635344, -99.932434).

Climate
The climate in this area is characterized by hot, humid summers and generally mild to cool winters.  According to the Köppen Climate Classification system, Ransom has a humid subtropical climate, abbreviated "Cfa" on climate maps.

Demographics

2010 census
As of the census of 2010, there were 294 people, 129 households, and 80 families residing in the city. The racial makeup of the city was 99.3% White and 0.7% from two or more races. Hispanic or Latino of any race were 0.7% of the population.

There were 129 households, of which 24.8% had children under the age of 18 living with them, 51.2% were married couples living together, 7.0% had a female householder with no husband present, 3.9% had a male householder with no wife present, and 38.0% were non-families. 36.4% of all households were made up of individuals, and 22.5% had someone living alone who was 65 years of age or older. The average household size was 2.08 and the average family size was 2.68.

The median age in the city was 52.7 years. 19.4% of residents were under the age of 18; 3% were between the ages of 18 and 24; 16.1% were from 25 to 44; 25.8% were from 45 to 64; and 35.7% were 65 years of age or older. The gender makeup of the city was 46.9% male and 53.1% female.

2000 census
As of the census of 2000, there were 338 people, 141 households, and 83 families residing in the city. The racial makeup of the city was 99.41% White, 0.30% from other races, and 0.30% from two or more races. 0.59% of the population were Hispanic or Latino of any race.

There were 141 households, out of which 26.2% had children under the age of 18 living with them, 49.6% were married couples living together, 7.8% had a female householder with no husband present, and 41.1% were non-families. 40.4% of all households were made up of individuals, and 23.4% had someone living alone who was 65 years of age or older. The average household size was 2.17 and the average family size was 2.88.

In the city, the population was spread out, with 23.7% under the age of 18, 2.7% from 18 to 24, 20.1% from 25 to 44, 21.9% from 45 to 64, and 31.7% who were 65 years of age or older. The median age was 47 years. For every 100 females, there were 82.7 males. For every 100 females age 18 and over, there were 76.7 males.

The median income for a household in the city was $31,771, and the median income for a family was $43,333. Males had a median income of $28,542 versus $18,906 for females. The per capita income for the city was $18,123. 5.2% of the population and 2.8% of families were below the poverty line. None of those under the age of 18 and 13.3% of those 65 and older were living below the poverty line.

Education

Public
The community is served by Western Plains USD 106 public school district. The Western Plains High School mascot is Bobcats.

Ransom High School was closed through school unification. The Ransom Longhorns won the Kansas State High School boys class 1A Track & Field championship in 1972 and 1999. USD 106 formed in 2004 by the consolidation of Ransom USD 302 and Bazine USD 304.

Library
Ransom is served by the Ransom Public Library.

Notable people 
 Nolan Cromwell, NFL coach and former player. Ransom High class of 1973
 Bertha Horchem,  pilot who in 1923 set the woman's altitude record in an aircraft at 16,300 feet
 Ruth Riley, professional basketball player

References

Further reading

External links

 City of Ransom
 Ransom - Directory of Public Officials
 Historic Images - Wichita State University Libraries
 Ransom city map, KDOT

Cities in Ness County, Kansas
Cities in Kansas